Huwayr al-Turukman; also known as Huweir is a Syrian village located in the Awj Subdistrict of the Masyaf District in Hama Governorate. According to the Syria Central Bureau of Statistics (CBS), Huwayr al-Turukman had a population of 1,003 in the 2004 census. Its inhabitants are predominantly Turkmens.

References

Bibliography

Turkmen communities in Syria
Populated places in Masyaf District